Graver may refer to:

 Burin (engraving) (French burin, "cold chisel"), a tool used in the art of engraving
 Graver (surname), an older English name, still common
 Graver basis
 a neologism derived from "goth" and "raver", primarily used as an alternative term for Cybergoth